San Simon River may refer to:

 San Simon River (Arizona)
 San Simón River in Bolivia